Pero's Bridge is a pedestrian bascule bridge that spans St Augustine's Reach in Bristol Harbour, Bristol, England.  It links Queen Square and Millennium Square.

Structure 
The bridge is composed of three spans; the two outer ones are fixed and the central section can be raised to provide a navigation channel in the harbour.  The most distinctive features of the bridge are the pair of horn-shaped sculptures which act as counterweights for the lifting section, leading it to be commonly known as the Horned Bridge or Shrek's Bridge as the counterweights resemble the ears of the animated star of the eponymous film.

Pero 
The bridge is named after Pero, also known as Pero Jones, who lived from around 1753 to 1798, arriving in Bristol from the Caribbean Island of Nevis in 1783, as the slave of the merchant John Pinney (1740–1818) at 7 Great George Street. Pinney also brought his wife's maid with him, Frances Coker, had also been born a slave, but Pinney had freed her some years before.

History 
The bridge was designed by the Irish artist Eilis O'Connell, in conjunction with Ove Arup & Partners engineers. It was formally opened in 1999 by Paul Boateng MP, then a Home Office minister.  The name of the bridge was attacked by then Liberal Democrat councillor Stephen Williams. He condemned the decision as "gesture politics", instead wanting a statue or permanent memorial to remember Bristol's role in the slave trade. Eilis O'Connell commented  "The council can call it what they want, but Pero's Bridge sounds a bit political." Hundreds of people now attach padlocks to the bridge as a sign of affection to each other.

For four days in June 2020, the Statue of Edward Colston, a Bristolian slave trader, lay at the bottom of the harbour directly south of the bridge after being toppled from its plinth by protestors during the George Floyd protests. It was then retrieved by the council and put in storage. It now resides as a permanent feature in Bristol's M-Shed museum shown now lying instead of standing, with all original protest graffiti maintained.

Dimensions 

References

Bibliography

External links 

 360 degree panorama of the bridge from BBC
 Bristol City Council presentation & booklet
 

Bascule bridges
Bridges in Bristol
Bristol Harbourside
History of Bristol
Tourist attractions in Bristol
Bridges completed in 1999
Pedestrian bridges in England
Pero
1999 establishments in England